Wheal Gorland was a metalliferous mine located just to the north-east of the village of St Day, Cornwall, in England, United Kingdom. It was one of the most important Cornish mines of the late 18th and early 19th centuries, both for the quantity of ore it produced and for the wide variety of uncommon secondary copper minerals found there as a result of supergene enrichment. It is the type locality for the minerals chenevixite, clinoclase, cornwallite, kernowite and liroconite.

History
The production of the mine was very inconsistent because of the sporadic distribution of its rich ore-bodies: in 1833 George Abbot wrote that it had made profits of over £300,000, produced 1,400 tons of ore per annum, and ranked third, in terms of profits, just behind Dolcoath mine and Consolidated Mines. However, in 1865 Thomas Spargo wrote "now part of St. Day United; idle".

In the early 1790s Wheal Gorland was connected to the Great County Adit and its own existing shallow adits were adapted to drain into this deeper adit. Records show that between 1815 and 1851 the mine produced 40,750 tons of 7½% copper ore, 15 tons of black tin, and 18 tons of arsenic. Much fluorspar was also produced, and gold was reputedly found in the gossan. In 1852 the mine was taken over by the St. Day United Group of mines and it became the main site for maintenance of the Great County Adit, but by 1864 it had been abandoned.

The mine was reopened in 1906 when Edgar Allen and Company reworked the stopes and the dumps for tin and tungsten ores. It sold 164 tons of tungsten ore and 18 tons of black tin before closing, for the last time, in 1909.

Since 1988 the site has been designated as a Site of Special Scientific Interest because of the variety and quality of lead and copper minerals that have been found in the mine dumps. A condition summary compiled on 21 July 2010 reported that the site was in an ″unfavourable declining condition″ because growth of scrubland vegetation was encroaching on to the waste dumps and hindering future excavations in search of minerals for scientific study. The summary further states that the vegetation on the remaining mine dump may also be affecting the minerals themselves, as formation of new soil horizons could affect chemical processes within the dump.

See also

 Mining in Cornwall and Devon

References

Tin mines in Cornwall
Copper mines in Cornwall
Sites of Special Scientific Interest in Cornwall
Sites of Special Scientific Interest notified in 1988
Industrial archaeological sites in Cornwall